This list of Nobel laureates by university affiliation shows the university affiliations of individual winners of the Nobel Prize since 1901 and the Nobel Memorial Prize in Economic Sciences since 1969. The affiliations are those at the time of the Nobel Prize announcement. Different universities adopt different criteria—from generous to conservative—for claiming Nobel affiliates, which may not match this list.

See also 
 List of Nobel laureates by country

References